Timothy Granaderos Jr. (born September 9, 1986) is an American actor and model. He is known for his role as Montgomery De La Cruz in the Netflix teen drama series 13 Reasons Why. He has also appeared in the psychological thriller web series Tagged as Ash Franklin and In the Vault as Taylor Price in 2017, in addition to several music videos.

Early life and education 
Granaderos was born in Ypsilanti, Michigan, and raised in Portage, Michigan. He later moved to Los Angeles to pursue modeling and acting. Granaderos is half-Filipino. His father is a Filipino of the Chavacano ethnic group from Zamboanga admixture. Granaderos graduated from Portage Northern High School and later attended Michigan State University, where he majored in advertising and played on the Michigan State Spartans men's soccer team.

Career

Acting 
Before beginning his acting career, he worked as a production assistant on the short film Committed. In 2016, he played Ash Franklin in the web series Tagged. He also appeared in the TV show In the Vault as Taylor Price.

Granaderos made recurring appearances in the first two seasons of 13 Reasons Why. He was promoted to series regular for season 3. Granaderos had originally auditioned for the roles of Justin Foley, Tony Padilla and Jeff Atkins, before being cast as Montgomery De La Cruz.

He was represented by Silver Mass Entertainment and AKA Talent Agency.

Modeling 
Granaderos is represented by One Management, and appeared in various commercials and print ads. He also supported and modeled for a clothing company called "hnly".

Filmography

Film

Television

Music videos

References

External links
 

1986 births
21st-century American male actors
American male actors of Filipino descent
American male film actors
American male television actors
Association football players not categorized by nationality
Association footballers not categorized by position
Living people
Male actors from Michigan
Michigan State Spartans men's soccer players
Michigan State University alumni
People from Portage, Michigan
People from Ypsilanti, Michigan